Újpesti Torna Egylet (Újpesti TE or UTE) is a Hungarian sports society, based in Újpest, Budapest. The club, which was founded in 1885, includes sports sections that represent the club at ice hockey, men's water polo, women's volleyball, athletics, wrestling, judo, mud wrestling, flatwater canoeing/kayaking, karate, youth football, boxing, modern pentathlon, shooting, gymnastics, triathlon, swimming, and fencing. There is a leisure section and a section for the club's fans called 'circle of friends' (baráti kör).

The football team Újpest FC is also a part of the Újpesti TE family.

Departments

Team sports
 Football:
 men's football (since 1885)
 women's football
 Ice hockey:
 men's ice hockey (since 1930)
 women's ice hockey
 Volleyball:
 women's volleyball (1948–1990, since 1950)
 Curling

Individual sports
 Athletics (since 1903)
 Boxing (since 1926)
 Canoing (since 1951)
 Gymnastics
 Fencing (since 1922)
 Footgolf
 Judo
 Karate
 Modern pentathlon (since 1962)
 Shooting
 Swimming (since 1910)
 Skating
 Taekwondo (since 2005)
 Triathlon (since 1991)
 Wrestling
 E-sports

Dissolved departments
 Water polo:
 men's water polo (1891–2011)
 Volleyball:
 men's volleyball
 Handball:
 men's handball
 women's handball

Supporters and rivalries

Supporters
Supporters of Újpest are mainly from the fourth district of Budapest, the eponymous Újpest. Due to the success in the 1970s, the club gained supporters from all over Budapest and the country.

Notable supporters

Zoltán Zana ("Ganxta Zolee"), rapper and actor
Henrik Havas, journalist and television personality)
György Gyula Zagyva, politician
András Stohl, actor and television personality
Zsolt Wintermantel, politician and former mayor of Újpest)
Attila Széki ("Curtis"), rapper and former footballer
Péter Majoros ("Majka"), rapper and television personality

Rivalries

Újpest are in rivalry with several teams from Budapest including Ferencváros, MTK Budapest, Budapest Honvéd and several provincial clubs such as Debrecen and Diósgyőr. Since Újpest have been the third most successful club of the Hungarian Football history by winning 20 Hungarian League titles and 9 Hungarian Cup titles and the most successful Hungarian club in the European football competitions in the 1970s every club in the Hungarian League wants to defeat them.

The rivalry with Ferencváros dates back to 1930s when Újpest won their first Hungarian League title. Since then the fixture between the two teams attracts the most spectators in the domestic league. The matches between the two team often ends in violence which causes big trouble for the Hungarian football. The proposal of personal registration was refused by both clubs.

Honours

Active departments

Football (men's)

Hungarian Championship
Winners (20): 1929–30, 1930–31, 1932–33, 1934–35, 1938–39, 1945, 1945–46, 1946–47, 1959–60, 1969, 1970, 1970–71, 1971–72, 1972–73, 1973–74, 1974–75, 1977–78, 1978–79, 1989–90, 1997–98
 Hungarian Second League:
 Winners (2): 1904, 1911–12
Hungarian Cup
Winners (11): 1969, 1970, 1974–75, 1981–82, 1982–83, 1986–87, 1991–92, 2001–02, 2013–14, 2017–18, 2020–21
Hungarian Super Cup (defunct)
Winners (3): 1992, 2002, 2014

Mitropa Cup (defunct)
Winners (2): 1929, 1939
Coupe des Nations (defunct, predecessor of Champions League)
Winner (1): 1930
Joan Gamper Trophy:
Winner (1): 1970
Trofeo Colombino: (defunct)
Winner (1): 1971

Ice hockey (men's)

Hungarian Championship:
Winners (13): 1957–58, 1959–60, 1964–65, 1965–66, 1967–68, 1968–69, 1969–70, 1981–82, 1982–83, 1984–85, 1985–86, 1986–87, 1987–88
Hungarian Cup:
Winners (9): 1964–65, 1965–66, 1969–70, 1970–71, 1971–72, 1984–85, 1985–86, 1987–88, 1989–90
Peace Cup:
Winners (5): 1957, 1958, 1959, 1961, 1962

Volleyball (women's)

Hungarian Championship
Winners (10): 1962–63, 1964, 1965, 1966, 1967, 1968, 1970, 1985–86, 1986–87, 1989–90
Hungarian Cup
Winners (12): 1961–62, 1962–63, 1964, 1965, 1966, 1967, 1968, 1974, 1975, 1983–84, 1985–86, 1986–87

Inactive departments

Water polo (men's)

Hungarian Championship
Winners (26) (record): 1930, 1931, 1932, 1933, 1934, 1935, 1936, 1937, 1938, 1939, 1941, 1942, 1945, 1946, 1948, 1950, 1951, 1952, 1955, 1960, 1967, 1985–86, 1990–91, 1992–93, 1993–94, 1994–95
Hungarian Cup
Winners (19): 1929, 1931, 1932, 1933, 1934, 1935, 1936, 1938, 1939, 1944, 1948, 1951, 1952, 1955, 1960, 1963, 1975, 1990–91, 1992–93

LEN Champions League (as European Cup)
Winner (1): 1993–94
LEN Euro Cup (as LEN Trophy)
Winners (3): 1992–93, 1996–97, 1998–99
LEN Super Cup
Winner (1): 1994

Volleyball (men's)

Hungarian Championship
Winners (13): 1955, 1957, 1957–58, 1958–59, 1959–60, 1960–61, 1961–62, 1962–63, 1971, 1972, 1975, 1989–90, 1990–91
Hungarian Cup
Winners (8): 1952, 1955, 1957, 1961–62, 1964, 1973, 1975, 1988–89

Handball (men's)

Hungarian Championship
Winners (2): 1953, 1958
Hungarian Cup
Winners (2): 1951, 1956

International honours

Notable former players

Olympic champions

 István Barta, water polo
 Olivér Halassy water polo
 Endre Kabos fencing (sabre)
 János Németh water polo
 Mihály Bozsi, water polo
 Károly Kárpáti, wrestling
 György Kutasi water polo
 Miklós Szilvásy, wrestling
 Dezső Gyarmati, water polo
 Dezső Lemhényi water polo
 Miklós Martin water polo
 György Vízvári water polo
 János Urányi, canoe sprint
 László Fábián, canoe sprint
 Ágnes Keleti, gymnastics
 Mihály Mayer, water polo
 Imre Polyák, wrestling (Greco-Roman)
 Paula Marosi, fencing (foil)
 Ildikó Rejtő, fencing (foil)
 Ferenc Bene, football
 Zoltán Dömötör, water polo
 Gyula Zsivótzky, athletics (hammer throw)
 Antal Dunai, football
 László Fazekas, football
 László Nagy, football
 Ernő Noskó, football
 Tibor Cservenyák, water polo
 László Sárosi, water polo
 Norbert Növényi, wrestling (Greco-Roman)
 Tamás Darnyi, swimming
 Attila Mizsér, pentathlon
 Bence Szabó, fencing (sabre)
 László Csongrádi, fencing (sabre)
 Péter Farkas, wrestling (Greco-Roman)
 Kinga Czigány, canoe sprint
 Éva Dónusz, canoe sprint
 Erika Mészáros, canoe sprint
 Krisztián Berki, gymnastics (pommel horse)
 Danuta Kozák, canoe sprint
 Sándor Tótka, canoe sprint

Presidents 
List of the presidents of the Újpesti TE:

 1885–1887: János Goll
 1887–1892: Lajos Mády
 1892–1897: Béla Csepcsányi
 1897–: 
 –1903: 
 1903–1905: Arnold Kada
 1905–: Mór Oszmann
 1909–: Samu Blum
 1910–: Lehel Héderváry
 1914–: Ödön Kálmán
 1919–1925: János Szücs
 1925–1942: Lipót Aschner

References

External links 
  Official website

 
Multi-sport clubs in Hungary
Sports teams in Hungary
Sport in Budapest
Sports clubs established in 1885
1885 establishments in Hungary